Serole is a comune (municipality) in the Province of Asti in the Italian region Piedmont, located about  southeast of Turin and about  south of Asti.

Serole borders the following municipalities: Cortemilia, Merana, Olmo Gentile, Perletto, Pezzolo Valle Uzzone, Piana Crixia, Roccaverano, and Spigno Monferrato.

Demographic evolution

References

External links
 www.comune.serole.at.it

Cities and towns in Piedmont